The San Francisco Bowl was an annual postseason college football bowl game certified by the NCAA and played in the San Francisco Bay Area. Originally named the Diamond Walnut San Francisco Bowl during its first two editions from 2002 to 2003, it was the Emerald Bowl from 2004 to 2009, the Kraft Fight Hunger Bowl from 2010 to 2013, the Foster Farms Bowl from 2014 to 2017, and the Redbox Bowl from 2018 to 2020. San Francisco Bowl naming returned during planning for a 2021 game.

The game had four sellouts -- 2006 (UCLA vs. Florida State), 2008 (Cal vs. Miami), 2009 (USC vs. Boston College) and 2011 (Nevada vs. Boston College)-- and three of the highest rated bowls ever televised on ESPN. It also gained a national reputation for the quality of hospitality provided to the participating teams.

The game was most recently played in December 2019. From 2002 to 2013, it was played at Pacific Bell Park, home of the San Francisco Giants, in San Francisco, California. From 2014 through 2019, it was played at Levi's Stadium, home of the San Francisco 49ers, in Santa Clara, California.

At the end of July 2020, organizers cancelled the 2020 edition of the bowl due to concerns around the COVID-19 pandemic; at the same time, the 49ers released a statement noting that "the decision has been made to not renew the current agreement to host the game moving forward". On September 10, 2021, it was announced that the game was again canceled for the 2021–22 bowl season, putting its future in jeopardy.

History
The game was founded by John Marks, president of the San Francisco Convention & Visitors Bureau, San Francisco Giants executive Pat Gallagher and sports industry veteran Gary Cavalli, former Associate Athletic Director at Stanford University and president of the pioneering American Basketball League, for the purpose of utilizing the Giants new ballpark, bringing visitors to San Francisco during a traditionally slow time of the year, and rewarding two successful teams with a week in San Francisco. 
 
Plans for the inaugural 2002 San Francisco Bowl were established on Dec. 2, 2002, when the Air Force Falcons football program accepted a bid to play against an undetermined team from the Big East Conference. Their initial sponsor was Diamond Foods, a producer of walnuts and other nuts under the Emerald brand name, resulting in the name Diamond Walnut San Francisco Bowl, and later the Emerald Bowl.

In 2010, Kraft Foods became the sponsor of the bowl and announced the new name, which the corporation launched as part of a broader hunger relief program. Mondelēz International continued to support the game and the program related with Feeding America in 2013.

In August 2014, the bowl's official website listed the game's name as the San Francisco Bowl once again.  However, on November 11, 2014, it was announced that the San Francisco Bowl Game Association had reached a multi-year naming rights deal with Northern California-based poultry company Foster Farms, resulting in the game being named the Foster Farms Bowl.

On July 12, 2016, the San Francisco 49ers NFL team announced that it had taken over management of the Foster Farms Bowl from the San Francisco Bowl Game Association, and also announced a new, four-year broadcast rights deal with Fox Sports, replacing ESPN.

In September 2018, Redbox (a chain of video rental kiosks) announced it had become the new title sponsor.

Conference tie-ins
The game had a contract to host the Pac-12's sixth-place team during the 2010 through 2013 seasons. There were multiple contracts that determined the opponent. In 2011, the Pac-12 team's opponent was Illinois, replacing Army, which did not achieve bowl eligibility; in 2012, it was Navy; and in 2013, it was BYU. Had these teams not qualified for bowl eligibility, they would have been replaced by teams from the Atlantic Coast Conference (ACC) or the Mid-American Conference (MAC).

Beginning with the 2014 season, teams come from the Pac-12 and Big Ten conferences. With Oregon's appearance in the 2018 edition, Colorado and Washington State are the only Pac-12 members who have not appeared in the game.

Field configuration
Because Pacific Bell Park (as it was named when it first hosted the bowl) is a baseball park and not normally used for football, arrangement of the field required both teams to be on the same sideline (southeast), separated by a barrier at the 50-yard line (in shallow right-center field). The opposite sideline (northwest) ran along the third base line, with an end zone near the first base dugout, and the other near the left field wall. Primary seating was in the third base grandstand, with temporary bleacher seating in right-center field.

Results
Rankings are based on the AP Poll prior to the game being played.

Source:

MVPs

Most appearances
Updated through the December 2019 edition (18 games, 36 total appearances).
Teams with multiple appearances

Teams with a single appearance
Won (11): Arizona State, Florida State, Nebraska, Nevada, Oregon, Oregon State, Purdue, Stanford, USC, Virginia Tech, Washington

Lost (9): Air Force, Arizona, BYU, Colorado State, Georgia Tech, Indiana, Miami (FL), Michigan State, New Mexico

Appearances by conference
Updated through the December 2019 edition (18 games, 36 total appearances).

 Games marked with an asterisk (*) were played in January of the following calendar year.
 The Pac-12's record includes appearances when the conference was the Pac-10 (3–1).
 Virginia Tech (2002) and Boston College (2003) appeared as members of the Big East; the American Athletic Conference (The American) retains the Big East's conference charter following the 2013 split of the original Big East along football lines.
 Independent appearances: Navy (2004, 2012) and BYU (2013).
 The WAC no longer sponsors FBS-level football.

Game records

Media coverage

From 2002 through 2015, the bowl was televised by ESPN or ESPN2; from 2016 to 2019, it was carried by Fox.

References
ref cite web https://www.insidetrackgarycavalliblog.com/single-post/the-bowl-games-you-should-watch-r-i-p-san-francisco-bowl-game

 
College football bowls
Sports competitions in San Francisco
Sports in Santa Clara, California
American football in the San Francisco Bay Area
Defunct college football bowls